Galivants Ferry Historic District is a national historic district located at Galivants Ferry in Horry County, South Carolina. It encompasses 28 contributing buildings that reflect the agricultural heritage of Galivants Ferry and of the larger Pee Dee region.  Included are tenant farmer houses, storage barns, tobacco packhouses, curing barns, and sheds.  The include the home of the Holliday family and a church that sits at the edge of a long stretch of tobacco fields on Pee Dee Road.  Also included is a filling station (ca. 1922) along U.S. Route 501.

It was listed on the National Register of Historic Places in 2001.

Gallery

References

External links
Galivants Ferry Historic District Map
Galivants Ferry Historic District - Conway, South Carolina - U.S. National Register of Historic Places on Waymarking.com

Historic districts on the National Register of Historic Places in South Carolina
Buildings and structures in Horry County, South Carolina
National Register of Historic Places in Horry County, South Carolina